Sudhir Mishra (born 22 January 1959) is an Indian film director and screenwriter known for directing the films Hazaaron Khwaishein Aisi, Dharavi and Chameli.

Mishra has had a 30-year career, with his work recognised by the Government of India with three National Awards from the president of India, as well as Chevalier of the Ordre des Arts et des Lettres from the French government.

Early life and background
Sudhir Mishra was born and raised in Lucknow. He is the grandson of former Madhya Pradesh Chief Minister Dwarka Prasad Mishra. His father, Devendra Nath Mishra, was a founding member of the Lucknow Film Society.

After a year and a half with Badal Sircar, Sudhir Mishra left for Pune. In Pune, he spent time at the Film and Television Institute of India where his younger brother, Sudhanshu Mishra (to whom he credits to have learnt much of his cinema) was a student. Sudhir never studied at the institute himself. He gained a Master of Philosophy degree in Delhi.

Career
He moved to Mumbai in 1980, and started his career as assistant director and scriptwriter in Kundan Shah's comedy Jaane Bhi Do Yaaron (1983) and later worked with Saeed Akhtar Mirza in Mohan Joshi Hazir Ho! (1984) and with Vidhu Vinod Chopra in Khamosh (1985).

He made his directorial debut with the film, Yeh Woh Manzil To Nahin in 1987 which won the National Film Award for Best First Film of a Director.

He went on to make films including Dharavi (1991), Main Zinda Hoon (1988), Is Raat Ki Subah Nahin (1996) and Chameli (2003), and the 2005 movie on the Naxalite movement, Hazaaron Khwaishein Aisi. This was followed by Khoya Khoya Chand in December 2007 and Yeh Saali Zindagi in 2011. He made film Inkaar  in 2013. The movie starred Arjun Rampal and Chitrangada Singh.

In 2018, he wrote and directed a modern adaptation of Devdas titled Daas Dev starring Rahul Bhat and Richa Chaddha. After this, he directed an adaptation of the popular Israeli show Hostages. The show got mixed reviews but received critical acclaim for the performances of Ronit Roy and Tisca Chopra. A second season for the show was also made in 2020 in which he was the showrunner.

Next, he adapted Manu Joseph's award-winning novel Serious Men in co-production with Bombay Fables for Netflix India. The film, which released in October 2020, received favorable reviews by critics and viewers. Indian film critic Mayank Shekhar said of the film, "the fact that this is a subtle, mature satire, rather than LOL comedy of manners (would've enjoyed some of the latter too). That in all its overt simplicity, this is also a complex story — about failure, first; and on the underclass, only later." The film won Best Web Original Film Award at Filmfare OTT Awards 2021, and Best Editing and Best Cinematography at the Asian Academy Creative Awards. Actor Nawazuddin Siddiqui received a nomination at the International Emmy Awards and won best actor at the Filmfare OTT Awards 2021 for his performance.

Awards
 1987 Indira Gandhi Award for Best Debut Film of a Director: Yeh Woh Manzil To Nahin (1987)
 1988 National Film Award for Best Film on Other Social Issues: Main Zinda Hoon (1988) 
 1991 National Film Award for Best Feature Film in Hindi: Dharavi (1991)
 2006 Filmfare Best Story Award: Hazaaron Khwaishein Aisi (2005)
 2010 Ordre des Arts et des Lettres (French government) 
2016 Yash Bharti Award by the Government of Uttar Pradesh.

Filmography

Films

Television 
 Hostages (2019) for Hotstar - Director
 Tanaav (2022) for SonyLIV - Director
 Jehanabad - Of Love & War (2023) for SonyLIV - Showrunner

References

External links

 
 Moon And Sixpence, Nisha Susan on the shambling creativity of Sudhir Mishra
 Interview with Sudhir Mishra on his film Hazaaron Khwaishein Aisi
 Sudhir's Blog at PassionforCinema
 Sudhir Mishra comments on his films

Living people
Hindi-language film directors
20th-century Indian film directors
Filmfare Awards winners
Chevaliers of the Ordre des Arts et des Lettres
Delhi University alumni
Artists from Lucknow
21st-century Indian film directors
20th-century Indian dramatists and playwrights
21st-century Indian dramatists and playwrights
Hindi screenwriters
Film directors from Uttar Pradesh
Screenwriters from Uttar Pradesh
Director whose film won the Best Debut Feature Film National Film Award
Producers who won the Best Debut Feature Film of a Director National Film Award
Directors who won the Best Film on Other Social Issues National Film Award
1959 births